Dixeia leucophanes, the spotless black-veined small white, is a butterfly in the family Pieridae. It is found in Zambia, Mozambique and Zimbabwe. The habitat consists of forests and heavy woodland.

References

Butterflies described in 1976
Pierini